This is a survey of the postage stamps and postal history of the Northern Nigeria Protectorate.

First stamps
Postage stamps were issued specifically for the Northern Nigeria Protectorate beginning in 1900. All stamps of the Northern Nigeria Protectorate are definitive issues of a Key Plate design, differing in the sovereign depicted, type of paper, watermarks, and choice of colored or colorless numerals for the denomination.

The first series consisted of nine stamps with values ranging from 1/2 pence to 10 shillings, depicting Queen Victoria. The second series, consisting of identical denominations, but in slightly different colors was issued on July 1, 1902, depicting King Edward VII. Unusually, a £25 stamp was issued in April 1904. This was really intended as a revenue stamp, it being nearly impossible to invent a piece of mail needing so much postage. It was used to pay for imported liquor licences. It is the great rarity of philately with copies commanding a high price. The King Edward series was reissued in 1905 in eight denominations, and again in 1910–11 in eleven denominations.

The final series of stamps for the Northern Nigeria Protectorate was a series of thirteen denominations depicting King George V.

Stamps of Northern Nigeria were replaced by those of the Colony and Protectorate of Nigeria in 1914.

Borgu local post

A local post briefly existed at Borgu in 1905 for which crudely made one penny stamps were produced.

See also
Postage stamps and postal history of the Southern Nigeria Protectorate
Postage stamps and postal history of Nigeria
Revenue stamps of Northern Nigeria

References

Further reading 

Proud, Ted. The Postal History of Nigeria. Heathfield, Sussex: Proud Bailey, 1995. 

Philately of Nigeria